Francis is a ghost town in Wheeler County, Nebraska, United States.

History
A post office was established at Francis in 1883, and remained in operation until it was discontinued in 1917. Francis was likely named for an early settler.

References

Geography of Wheeler County, Nebraska